Miloš Rus (born April 4, 1962) is a former Slovenian football goalkeeper and manager.

Managerial statistics

References

External links
Soccerway profile

1962 births
Living people
Yugoslav footballers
Association football goalkeepers
NK Olimpija Ljubljana (1945–2005) players
NK Krka players
NK IB 1975 Ljubljana managers
NK Zagreb managers
NK Celje managers
J2 League managers
Vegalta Sendai managers
Yokohama FC managers
Expatriate footballers in Austria
Slovenian football managers
Expatriate football managers in Croatia
Slovenian expatriate sportspeople in Croatia
Expatriate football managers in Japan
Slovenian expatriate sportspeople in Japan
Slovenian expatriate football managers